is a railway station in Izumo, Shimane, Japan, operated by the Ichibata Electric Railway. It is the closest train station to the famous Izumo Taisha Shrine.

Station layout
The station is a terminus with two platforms, forming the final stop on the Taisha Line branch from Kawato Station on the Kita Matsue Line.

History
It was designed in a Western architectural style with striking stained glass windows as a feature. Formerly there was a tower as part of the central building, this has since been removed. The station building was registered as a Tangible Cultural Property of Japan in 1996. In 2009, it was certified by the Ministry of Economy, Trade and Industry as an important Heritage of Industrial Modernisation site for its value to the promotion of mass tourism in the METI Selection of “33 Heritage Constellations of Industrial Modernization: The Sequel”.

The station is the only rail link between Taisha and Izumo since the closure of the JR Taisha Station and the Taisha Line in 1990.

The station featured as a location setting in the 2008 NHK drama series  and Railways, a film set on the Ichibata Electric Railway line.

References

External links

Rail transport in Shimane Prefecture